The United States Virgin Islands Davis Cup team represents the United States Virgin Islands in Davis Cup tennis competition and are governed by the Virgin Islands Tennis Association. They have not competed since 2012.

Their best finish is seventh in Group III.

History
The US Virgin Islands competed in its first Davis Cup in 1998.

Current team (2022) 

 Tomas del Olmo
 Luca del Olmo
 Finlay Miller (Junior player)
 Nicholas Bass (Captain-player)

See also
Davis Cup

External links

Davis Cup teams
Davis Cup
Davis Cup
1998 establishments in the United States Virgin Islands
Sports clubs established in 1998